Vincent Henry (born November 1953) is an American saxophonist and guitarist who plays jazz and R&B.

Career
Henry was born in New York and grew up in Harlem. He started venturing out to concerts and clubs on his own when he was 14. In the early 1980s, he was part of the disco group Change. He also played with Johnny Kemp on his 1987 album Secrets of Flying, including taking a significant role shaping the R&B top five hit, "Dancin' with Myself" (the follow-up to the album's massive first hit, "Just Got Paid"). He then signed with Jive and released his first album Vincent in 1990.

Henry played and recorded music with and for artists such as Whitney Houston, Freddie Jackson, Glenn Jones, Jonathan Butler, Will Downing, Mary J. Blige, Ice Cube, Alicia Keys, Amy Winehouse and many others.

In the summer of 2008 Henry participated in Tom Waits' Glitter and Doom Tour of the US and Europe, out of which resulted the album Glitter and Doom Live. In the years that followed Henry appeared on a few of Hugh Laurie's albums, and he toured all over the world with Laurie, as a regular member of The Copper Bottom Band (playing a whole range of blowing instruments, including saxophones, clarinet and harmonica), ever since Laurie started touring and playing concerts as a professional blues musician.

Henry's work with Tom Waits and with Hugh Laurie was noted and highly acclaimed by the music reviews, but it was his work (and especially the extensive touring) with Hugh Laurie that finally exposed him to and got him discovered by the general audience.

In 2021 Henry took part in the creation of the soundtrack music from the motion picture The United States vs. Billie Holiday (and is credited for Bass, Clarinet, Guitar and Saxophone playing + Horn Arrangements for most of the tracks in that recording).

References

American male saxophonists
1953 births
Jive Records artists
Living people
Guitarists from New York (state)
20th-century American guitarists
21st-century American saxophonists
American male guitarists
20th-century American male musicians
21st-century American male musicians
Change (band) members